The Psychologists Registration Board of Western Australia is a government statutory authority responsible for regulating the psychology profession in the Western Australia.

The Board's authority is derived from the Psychologists Act of 2005 and associated regulations. The Board is responsible to the State Minister for Health for the administration of the Act. It consists of 8 members including 6 psychologists, a consumer representative and a legal practitioner.

It has had a publication.

The main function of the Board is to ensure that psychologists practising in Western Australia are properly qualified and registered. The Board also assesses complaints by people dissatisfied with the treatment they receive or the professional conduct of a psychologist.

References 

Government agencies of Western Australia
Psychology organisations based in Australia